Ravar Rural District is a rural district (dehestan) in the Central District of Ravar County, Kerman Province, Iran. At the 2006 census, its population was 8,230, in 2,357 families. The rural district has 50 villages.

References 

Rural Districts of Kerman Province
Ravar County